There are three Clava cairns in or near the Scottish Highland town of Aviemore. All three were described by Caleb George Cash, an honorary fellow of the Royal Scottish Geographical Society, in 1906.

Delfour stone circle
The stone circle is 4 miles SW of Aviemore railway station, and 2 miles NNE of Kincraig railway station, and in 1906 was located near a cottage. Its condition, as described by Cash in 1906, is ruinous; it could hardly be recognized as anything other than "a heap of stones cleared by the farmer from his fields". One stone of "striking appearance" is still standing. The middle circle of ca. 60 feet in diameter seems to have been used for the purpose of field clearing, with stones from the outer circles having been deposited there. The one solitary stone from what may have been an outer circle stands about 22 feet SW from the middle circle; it is a quartzite slab, 9'6" high, 5'6" wide, and 1'6" thick. Since it's tapered toward the top, it appears to Cash as a "cloaked human figure".

There is an outer kerb (58 ft in diameter) and an inner ring, made of smaller stones. There was a bank of small stones just outside the kerb, which was part of the design; stones from the field have been thrown onto that bank.

Gallery

Aviemore stone circle
The cairn consists of three stone circles, or remnants thereof. The outer one, of detached megaliths, is ca. 75 ft in diameter. The second circle is of graded kerbstone sets closely, with a diameter of ca. 42 feet, and the inner circle is ca. 26 feet. The cairn is mostly gone and only three or four slabs are left.

In 1877 there were still seven stones standing in the centre; when Aubrey Burl detailed the cairn in 2005, there were only five left, one of which has fallen. The tallest is 1.5 m high.The cairn is currently in the middle of a housing estate.

Gallery

Grenish stone circle

The Grenish circle is a little over 2 miles E.N.E. of the Aviemore railway station, some 350 yards east of the road, in an area of uneven moorland that was once covered in pine trees. A nearby lochan gets its name from the stones: Loch nan Carraigean, or "Loch of the Standing Stones". The Highland Railway's line to Carr Bridge runs nearby (now the preserved Strathspey Railway), only a few yards from the outer circle on the west side; equally close on the east side runs an old path from Aviemore to Boat of Garten.

Gallery

See also
Culloden Viaduct

References

External links
Highland Historic Environment Records:
MGH 4428, Delfour stone circle
MHG 3129, Aviemore stone circle
MHG 4648, Grenish stone circle

Archaeology of death
Bronze Age Scotland
Cairngorms
Chambered cairns in Scotland